Ibrahima is a male given name, a form of Ibrahim common in parts of Western Africa. Notable people with the name include:

 Ibrahima Aya (born 1967), Malian writer
 Ibrahima Bakayoko (born 1976), Ivorian footballer
 Ibrahima Bangoura (born 1982), Guinean footballer
 Ibrahima Camara (born 1985), Guinean footballer
 Ibrahima Baldé (born 1990), Senegalese footballer
 Ibrahima Faye (born 1979), Senegalese footballer
 Ibrahima Fofana (1952–2010), Guinean trade unionist
 Ibrahima Gueye (born 1978), Senegalese footballer
 Ibrahima (footballer) (Ibrahima Kalil Guirassy), French footballer 
 Ibrahima Kassory Fofana (born circa 1954), former Guinean politician
 Ibrahima Konaté (born 1999), French football player
 Ibrahima Moctar Sarr (born 1949), Mauritanian journalist and politician
 Ibrahima Sanoh (born 1994), Guinean footballer
 Ibrahima Sonko (born 1981), Senegalese footballer
 Ibrahima Sory Conte (born 1981), Guinean footballer
 Ibrahima Wade (born 1968), French sprinter
 Abdul Rahman Ibrahima Sori (1762–1829), African prince enslaved in the United States

See also 
 Ibrahim (name)